Starz is an American premium cable channel.

Starz may also refer to:

Film and television
 Starz Inc., a media holding company owning the cable channel and other Starz-branded operations
 Starz Distribution, the motion picture, animation, television, and home video division of Starz Inc.
 Starz Animation, a CGI animation studio in Toronto, Ontario, Canada
 Starz (Canada), an English-language premium cable and satellite television service
 Starz (magazine), a Malaysian manga, anime and comics magazine
 Starz TV, a former British digital satellite music channel

Music
 Starz (band), a 1970s American heavy metal and power pop band
 Starz (Starz album), an album by the band
 "Starz", a song by The Smashing Pumpkins from Zeitgeist
 Starz (Yung Lean album), a 2020 album by Swedish rapper Yung Lean

Other uses
 Orlando Starz, a franchise in the Independent Women's Football League, U.S.
 Starz (music venue), a live music venue in Allentown, Pennsylvania

See also

Star (disambiguation)
Stars (disambiguation)
 
 Utah Starzz, a Women's National Basketball Association team
 Utah Starzz (WPSL), women's soccer team